Quatro is Suzi Quatro's second album, released in October 1974 by Rak Records as SRAK 509, with the exceptions of the United States and Canada (where the album was released by Bell Records), Japan (EMI Records) and several territories in Europe (Columbia Records).

The album achieved success in several territories, topping the Australian chart and remaining on that chart for six weeks. It also entered the US charts, reaching the top 150. "Devil Gate Drive" became a major hit, reaching the No. 1 spot in the UK and Australian charts, becoming her second number one in both countries. The singles "The Wild One" and "Too Big" also achieved commercial success, with the former reaching the top 10 in both the UK and in Australia, and the latter reaching the top 20 in those same territories.

"The Wild One" was featured in Floria Sigismondi's 2010 film The Runaways, a coming-of-age film/biopic about Cherie Currie (portrayed by Dakota Fanning) and the 1970s all-girl rock band the Runaways. (The film was inspired by, and loosely based on, Currie's 1989 memoir Neon Angel). Suzi Quatro was a major influence both musically and personally for the Runaways and especially for Joan Jett, so the film makes several references to her.

Track listing

UK track listing

Notes
"Devil Gate Drive" was included on the album in most countries but was omitted from the UK first pressing. "Friday" was omitted from the original US release of the album. 
In some territories including the UK and US, the album contained a slow arrangement of "The Wild One" in replacement of the single version on the album. The fast rock version of the song was not made available in the US upon its initial release and remained unacknowledged in that region until several compilations were released years later. Both versions of the song were arranged by Phil Dennys.

Personnel
 Suzi Quatro – lead vocals, bass guitar
 Len Tuckey – guitar, backing vocals
 Alastair McKenzie – keyboards, backing vocals
 Dave Neal – drums, backing vocals

Chart positions

Year-end charts

Singles 
The album contained three songs that were major hits on the UK singles chart. "Devil Gate Drive" reached No. 1 in February 1974; "Too Big" rose to No. 14 in June; and "The Wild One" reached No. 7 in November.

References

External links

1974 albums
Suzi Quatro albums
Albums produced by Mike Chapman
Rak Records albums